The 1957 NCAA Cross Country Championships were the 19th annual cross country meet to determine the team and individual national champions of men's collegiate cross country running in the United States. Held on November 25, 1957, the meet was hosted by Michigan State University at the Forest Akers East Golf Course in East Lansing, Michigan. The distance for the race was 4 miles (6.4 kilometers). 

With the NCAA establishing a College Division championship the following year in 1958, this was the final NCAA cross country championship for which all NCAA members were eligible. In total, 17 teams and 124 individual runners contested this championship.

The team national championship was won by the Notre Dame Fighting Irish, their second. The individual championship was won by Max Truex, from USC, with a record time of 19:12.30. Truex's event distance record would remain in place until the distance for the championship race was changed to 6 miles in 1965.

Men's title
Distance: 4 miles (6.4 kilometers)

Team Result (Top 10)

References
 

NCAA Cross Country Championships
NCAA Cross Country Championships
NCAA University Division Cross Country Championships
Sports competitions in East Lansing, Michigan
Track and field in Michigan
NCAA University Division Cross Country Championships
Michigan State University